Lisková is a village in the Ružomberok District of north-central Slovakia. It lies at an elevation of 484 m and has an area of 15.95 km². It had a population of 2,077 in 2011.

History
In historical records the village was first mentioned in 1252. Of interest is Lisková Cave, a 1,900 m Guttenstein limestone formation from the middle Triassic. A cultic statuette of a horned bull was found in the cave. Other finds include the remains of a copper-age secondary burial (Lengyel culture), stone tools, and a mammoth tooth. The finds included the forehead of a human skull, which was destroyed in 1956. The remains were the first evidence of Pleistocene settlement in the territory of present-day Slovakia.

Notable people
Notable people that were born or lived in Lisková include:
Vavro Šrobár (1867–1950), doctor and politician

References

External links

https://web.archive.org/web/20071217080336/http://www.statistics.sk/mosmis/eng/run.html
http://www.liskova.sk

Villages and municipalities in Ružomberok District
Archaeological sites in Slovakia